Philodemus of Gadara (Philodēmos, "love of the people"; c. 110 – prob. c. 40 or 35 BC) was an Arabic Epicurean philosopher and poet. He studied under Zeno of Sidon in Athens, before moving to Rome, and then to Herculaneum. He was once known chiefly for his poetry preserved in the Greek Anthology, but since the 18th century, many writings of his have been discovered among the charred papyrus rolls at the Villa of the Papyri at Herculaneum. The task of excavating and deciphering these rolls is difficult, and work continues to this day. The works of Philodemus so far discovered include writings on ethics, theology, rhetoric, music, poetry, and the history of various philosophical schools. Ethel Ross Barker suggested in 1908 that he was owner of the Villa of the Papyri Library.

Life
Philodemus was born c. 110 BC, in Gadara, Coele-Syria (in present-day Jordan). He studied under the Epicurean Phoenician philosopher, Zeno of Sidon, the head (scholarch) of the Epicurean school, in Athens, before settling in Rome about 80 BC. He was a follower of Zeno, but an innovative thinker in the area of aesthetics, in which conservative Epicureans had little to contribute. He was a friend of Lucius Calpurnius Piso Caesoninus, and was implicated in Piso's profligacy by Cicero, who, however, praises Philodemus warmly for his philosophic views and for the elegans lascivia of his poems. Philodemus was an influence on Horace's Ars Poetica. The Greek anthology contains thirty-four of his epigrams - most of them, love poems.

The Villa of the Papyri
There was an extensive library at the Villa of the Papyri at Herculaneum, a significant part of which was formed by a library of Epicurean texts, some of which were present in more than one copy, suggesting the possibility that this section of the library was Philodemus' own. The contents of the villa were buried in the eruption of Vesuvius, 79 CE, and the papyri were carbonized and flattened but preserved.

During the 18th-century exploration of the Villa by tunnelling, from 1752 to 1754 there were recovered carbonized papyrus rolls containing thirty-six treatises attributed to Philodemus. These works deal with music, rhetoric, ethics, signs, virtues and vices, the good king, and defend the Epicurean standpoint against the Stoics and the Peripatetics. The first fragments of Philodemus from Herculaneum were published in 1824. In 2019, a scroll on the history of Plato's Academy, which had been unrolled and glued to cardboard in 1795, was analyzed using shortwave-infrared hyperspectral imaging. This not only revealed what was written on the back of the scroll, but also illuminated 150 new words on the front.

"The difficulties involved in unrolling, reading, and interpreting these texts were formidable. Naples was not a particularly hospitable destination for classical scholars. Finally, the philosophies of the Hellenistic schools were neither well-known nor highly regarded until quite recently. These factors combined to cripple scholarly interest in and use of the Herculaneum papyri. Recently, however, in part due to the efforts of the International Center for the Study of the Herculaneum Papyri, these rolls have been the object of renewed scholarly work and have yielded many findings indispensable for the study of Hellenistic philosophy." Today researchers work from digitally enhanced photographs, infra-red and multiple-imaging photography, and 18th-century transcriptions of the documents, which were being destroyed as they were being unrolled and transcribed. The actual papyri are in the National Library, Naples.

Named for the philosopher-poet, the Philodemus Project is an international effort, supported by a major grant from the National Endowment for the Humanities and by contributions of individuals and participating universities, to reconstruct new texts of Philodemus' works on Poetics, Rhetoric, and Music. These texts will be edited and translated and published in a series of volumes by Oxford University Press.

Philodemus: On Poems. I, edited with Introduction, Translation, and Commentary by Richard Janko, appeared in 2001 and won the Charles J. Goodwin Award of Merit. "Philodemus’ On Poems, in particular, opens a window onto a lost age of scholarship—the period between Aristotle's Poetics and Horace's Art of Poetry, the works which define classicism for the ancient and modern worlds," Janko has written.

The Project's next volumes are scheduled to be:
On Poems V, edited and translated by David Armstrong, James Porter, Jeffrey Fish, and Cecilia Mangoni
On Rhetoric I-II, edited and translated by David Blank
On Rhetoric III, edited and translated by Dirk Obbink and Juergen Hammerstaedt.

Inductive reasoning
In On Methods of Inference, Philodemus comments on the problem of induction, doubting the reliability of inductive reasoning from the observed to the unobserved. One problem is the existence of unique events that could never be guessed from what happens elsewhere. "There are also in our experience some infrequent occurrences, as for example the man in Alexandria half a cubit high, with a colossal head that could be beaten with a hammer, who used to be exhibited by the embalmers; the person in Epidaurus who was married as a young woman and then become a man." Induction is also unreliable if it extrapolates far beyond our experience: "We shall not, therefore, use the [inference] that since the men among us are mortal the men in Libya would also be mortal, much less the inference that since the living beings among us are mortal, if there are any living beings in Britain, they would be mortal."

List of Philodemus' works
This is a list of the major works of Philodemus found so far at Herculaneum.

Historical works
Index Stoicorum (PHerc. 1018)
Index Academicorum (PHerc. 164, 1021)
On the Stoics (PHerc. 155, 339)
On Epicurus (PHerc. 1232, 1289)
Works on the Records of Epicurus and some others (PHerc. 1418, 310)
To Friends of the School (PHerc. 1005)

Scientific works
On Phenomena and Inferences (PHerc. 1065)

Theological writings
On Piety (PHerc. 1428)
On the Gods (PHerc. 26)
On the Way of Life of the Gods (PHerc. 152, 157)

Ethics
On Vices and Virtues, book 7 (On Flattery) (PHerc. 222, 223, 1082, 1089, 1457, 1675)
On Vices and Virtues, book 9 (On Household Management) (PHerc. 1424)
On Vices and Virtues, book 10 (On Arrogance) (PHerc. 1008)
Comparetti Ethics (named after its first editor; PHerc. 1251)
On Death (PHerc. 1050)
On Frank Criticism (PHerc. 1471)
On Anger (PHerc. 182)

On rhetoric, music, and poetry
On Rhetoric (on many papyri)
On Music (PHerc. 1497)
On Poems (on many papyri)
On the Good King according to Homer (PHerc. 1507)

English translations
Philodemus: On Anger. (2020), David Armstrong & Michael McOsker. SBL. 
Philodemus: On Death. (2009), W. Benjamin Henry. SBL. 
Philodemus: On Frank Criticism. (1998), David Konstan, Diskin Clay, Clarence, E. Glad. SBL. 
Philodemus: On Methods of Inference. 2nd edition. (1978). Phillip Howard De Lacy, Estelle Allen De Lacy. Bibliopolis.
Philodemus, On Piety, Part 1. (1996). Critical Text with Commentary by Dirk Obbink. Oxford University Press. 
Philodemus, On Poems, Book 1. (2001). Edited with Introduction, Translation, and Commentary by Richard Janko. Oxford University Press. 
Philodemus, On Poems, Book 2, with the fragments of Heracleodorus and Pausimachus. (2020). Edited with Introduction, Translation, and Commentary by Richard Janko. Oxford University Press. 
Philodemus, On Poems, Books 3-4, with the Fragments of Aristotle, On Poets. (2010). Edited with Introduction, Translation, and Commentary by Richard Janko. Oxford University Press. 
Philodemus, On Property Management. (2013), Voula Tsouna. SBL. 
Philodemus, On Rhetoric Books 1 and 2: Translation and Exegetical Essays. (2005). Clive Chandler (editor). Routledge. 
David Sider, (1997), The Epigrams of Philodemos. Introduction, Text, and Commentary. Oxford University Press.

References

Further reading
 Armstrong, David, Jeffrey Fish, Patricia A. Johnson, and Marylin B. Skinner, eds. 2004. Vergil, Philodemus, and the Augustans. Austin: Univ. of Texas Press.
 Fitzgerald, John T., Dirk Obbink, and Glenn S. Holland, eds. 2004. Philodemus and the New Testament World. Leiden, The Netherlands, and Boston: Brill.
 Gigante, Marcello. 2002. Philodemus in Italy: The Books from Herculaneum. Translated by D. Obbink. Ann Arbor: Univ. of Michigan Press.
 Glad, Clarence E. 2010. Paul and Philodemus. Adaptability in Epicurean and Early Christian Psychagogy. Atlanta: Society of Biblical Literature.
 Hajdú, Péter. 2014. "The Mad Poet in Horace’s Ars Poetica." Canadian Review of Comparative Literature = Revue Canadienne de Littérature Comparée. 41.1: 28-42.
 Halliwell, Stephen. 2011. Between Ecstasy and Truth. Interpretations of Greek Poetics from Homer to Longinus.   Oxford; New York:  Oxford University Press. 
 Kemp, Jerome. 2010. "Flattery and Frankness in Horace and Philodemus." Greece & Rome 57.1: 65-76.
 Obbink, Dirk, ed. 1995. Philodemus and Poetry. New York and Oxford: Oxford Univ. Press.
 Pearcy, Lee T. 2012. "Does Dying Hurt?: Philodemus of Gadara, De Morte and Asclepiades of Bithynia." Classical Quarterly 62.1: 211-222.
 Sider, David. 1997. The Epigrams of Philodemos. New York and Oxford: Oxford Univ. Press.
 Sider, David. 2005. The Library of the Villa dei Papyri at Herculaneum. Los Angeles: J. Paul Getty Museum.
 Tsakiropoulou-Summers, Anastasia. 1998. "Horace, Philodemus and the Epicureans at Herculaneum." Mnemosyne 51.1: 20-29.
 Tsouna, Voula. 2011. "Philodemus, Seneca, and Plutarch on Anger." In Epicurus and the Epicurean Tradition. Edited by Jeffery Fish, 183-210. Cambridge; New York : Cambridge University Press.
 Tsouna, Voula. 2007. The Ethics of Philodemus. Oxford: Oxford Univ. Press.

External links

Philodemus Project

 Philodemus at the Digital Corpus of Literary Papyri.
 Philodemus: une bibliographie, annotated bibliography by Annick Monet
 Philodemus: translation of all surviving epigrams at attalus.org; adapted from W.R.Paton (1916–18)
David Armstrong, Jeffrey Fish, Patricia A. Johnston, and Marilyn B. Skinner, eds., 2003, Vergil, Philodemus, and the Augustans; condensed introduction on-line
Philodemus' writings (Greek texts): Rhetorica, ed. Sudhaus, vol. 1, vol. 2; Academica, ed. Mekler; De Musica, ed. Kemke
Harry M. Hubbel: The Rhetorica of Philodemus. Translation and Commentary, Transactions of the Connecticut Academy of Arts and Sciences 23, 1920, 243-382

Hellenistic-era philosophers from Syria
Roman-era Epicurean philosophers
Classical humanists
110s BC births
30s BC deaths
Epigrammatists of the Greek Anthology
Roman-era philosophers in Rome
Roman-era students in Athens
1st-century BC poets
1st-century BC philosophers